Elections in Egypt are held for the President and a bicameral legislature. The President of Egypt is elected for a six-year term by popular vote after draft amendments to the 2013 constitution altered the presidential term limits from the original four years to six years.

Suffrage is universal and compulsory for every Egyptian citizen over 18. Failure to vote can result in a fine or even imprisonment, but in practice, a significant percentage of eligible voters do not vote. About 63 million voters are registered to vote out of a population of more than 100 million. Turnout in the 2011 parliamentary election was 54%.

Kingdom of Egypt (1922–1953)
The Kingdom of Egypt was granted nominal independence by the United Kingdom on 28 February 1922. Between the Declaration of 1922 and the Revolution of 1952, ten general elections were held (in 1924, 1925, 1926, 1929, 1931, 1936, 1938, 1942, 1945 and 1950). This era is generally known as Egypt's Liberal Experiment. Egypt has never recovered the level of political freedom it enjoyed during this period.

During the four elections held between 1924 and 1929, candidates from the Coptic Christian minority received 15 to 23 seats. Copts received four seats in 1931, six in 1938, 12 in 1945, and five in 1950. The opposition's share of seats also varied throughout this period. The opposition won 15.1% of the seats in the 1924 election, 18.9% in 1926, 6.9% in 1929, 18.1% in 1936, 12.1% in 1942, and 29.2% in the 1950 election, the last to be held before the 1952 Revolution which ended Egypt's multi-party system.

Elections under the Mubarak regime

2005 Presidential election

Under the Mubarak era, the Egyptian presidential election of 2005 was the first-ever multi-party, multi-candidate contested presidential election in Egypt's history, made under the 2005/2007 constitutional amendments to the 1971 Constitution of Egypt. Despite its significance, the election was marred by voter fraud, ballot stuffing, boycotts, intimidation, vote-buying, and protests by opposition groups, leading to a low turnout of under 30%. Before the 2005 election, the President of Egypt was nominated by a two-thirds majority of the rubber-stamp People's Assembly and approved under a referendum process that resembles a show election in authoritarian countries.

2010 Parliamentary elections

Under the Mubarak era, The People's Assembly and Shura Council were elected under an electoral system of single member plurality. Along with the combination of voter fraud, ballot stuffing, intimidation, and lack of judicial and international supervision, this ensured the NDP a super-majority win of seats for both houses. The Muslim Brotherhood was not recognized as a political party by the law, but its members were allowed to run as independents.

Latest elections

2020 Senate election

2018 Presidential election

2020 Parliamentary election

Next elections

Egyptian presidential elections are held using a two-round system; the next election should be held in 2024.

The House of Representatives sits for a five-year term but can be dissolved earlier by the president.

Referendums
The first referendum in Egypt was held on 23 June 1956. The electorate agreed with the adoption of the new 1956 constitution, and with the election of Gamal Abdel Nasser as President of Egypt.

See also

 Electoral calendar
 Electoral system
 2019 Egyptian constitutional referendum

References

Bibliography

External links

 Egypt Elections Watch – Jadaliyya
 Aswatna Virtual Resource Center a central resource for electoral information in Egypt
 Global Integrity Report: Egypt has an analysis of election integrity in Egypt.
 Adam Carr's Election Archive
 IDEA Report on Egypt
 Elections in Egypt, Human Rights Watch, 2010